Christ Crowned with Thorns or Ecce Homo is a 1647 oil on canvas painting by Guercino, commissioned by Marchese Tanari and for which a preparatory drawing survives in the Morgan Library. The painting was bought by Maximilian I Joseph of Bavaria in 1819 or 1820 and is now in the Alte Pinakothek in Munich.

References

Guercino
1647 paintings
Collection of the Alte Pinakothek
Paintings by Guercino